Sanjeev Gupta (born September 1971) is an Indian-born British businessman, and the founder of Liberty House Group. He is the CEO and chairman of GFG Alliance, an international conglomerate that operates primarily in the steel and mining industries. Following the collapse of Greensill Capital in 2021, Sanjeev Gupta has been under scrutiny for his ties to the failed company, which involved opaque financing and sales invoices that Greensill's administrator has been unable to verify.

Early life

Gupta was born in Ludhiana, Punjab, India, the third of four children of Parduman K Gupta who founded the SIMEC Group. Both his father and grandfather were industrialists and businessmen. At age 13 he was enrolled at St Edmund's School, Canterbury, UK as a boarder. After completing his A-levels he spent his gap year selling bicycles in Turkey for his father before enrolling to study Economics at Trinity College, Cambridge. It is there that in February 1992 he founded the Liberty House Group. When the business was generating £1m a day, he switched to economics with management, a move which he claims freed up time to work on the business.

Career

Trading roots 
Initially, Liberty House traded steel, rice, sugar, fast-moving consumer goods, engineering and other goods as a part of the family business but it soon diversified into specific commodities and brought together the trading business under three categories—steel, chemicals, and agriculture. In 2009, it entered steel making, buying plants in Africa. A year later in 2010, it was in Asia, setting up the regional headquarters in Singapore and a hub in Hong Kong in 2012 to focus on China.

Industrial expansion 
In 2013, Liberty House Group entered the UK through the purchase of Mir Steel UK (previously Aphasteel), a steel mill in Newport, South Wales, stopping it from being shut down. The business was formally re-launched as Liberty Steel Newport in October 2015. In the two and a half years leading up to the re-opening Gupta kept the entire 150 people workforce on half-pay while he tried to get the mothballed site operating again. Liberty Steel Newport produces hot rolled coil (HRC) for the following industries: construction, automotive, pipes and tubes, structural hollow sections, highway, yellow goods, materials-handling and power.

In November and December 2015 Gupta purchased from administration the UK assets and business of the former Caparo Industries Plc, saving over 1,000 jobs primarily in the West Midlands.

In March 2016 Liberty House reached an agreement for the purchase of the last two previously mothballed steel manufacturing sites in Scotland from Tata Steel UK. The deal, which was brokered by the Scottish Government, was completed on 28 April 2016 when Liberty formally acquired the Clydebridge and Dalzell steel mills. The Dalzell site which manufactures steel plate was re-launched on 28 September 2016 by Scotland's First Minister Nicola Sturgeon.

In April 2016 when Tata Steel UK announced its intention to sell its UK based operations, Gupta launched a daring bid for the business, and launched Liberty House's Greensteel strategy.

In October 2016, Liberty House launched its steel recycling division called Liberty Metals Recycling.

In November 2016, Gupta finalised his purchase of Tungsten Bank, and renamed it Wyelands Bank, after the country house estate Wyelands he owns near Chepstow.

In November 2016 Liberty House entered into exclusive negotiations with Tata Steel UK for the acquisition of its speciality steels business based in West Yorkshire and China. In February 2017 Tata Steel UK and Liberty House signed an agreement on the purchase, and the deal was completed in April 2017. The acquisition saved 1,700 jobs across sites in Rotherham, Stocksbridge and Brinsworth, Bolton and Wednesbury.

In December 2016, the Gupta-led GFG Alliance completed the acquisition of Britain's last aluminium smelter at Fort William in Lochaber, along with the hydro-power plants at Kinlochleven and Fort William.

In August 2017, Gupta acquired Arriums Whyalla Steelworks in Australia, encompassing primary steelmaking, recycling, distribution and iron ore mining. The new business is conducted under the Liberty brand.

In December 2017, Gupta entered the US market by acquiring the Georgetown steelworks and expanded the US presence by acquiring Export Metals in March 2018. At the end of 2018, he purchased Keystone Consolidated Industries.

During December 2018, Gupta acquired Aluminium Dunkerque, the largest aluminium smelter in Europe. This followed the acquisition of AR Industries, a French aluminium wheel manufacturer.

In April 2019, Gupta acquired a second bank which he renamed the Commonwealth Trade Bank. He then doubled the GFG Alliance workforce in July 2019, by acquiring seven steelworks and five service centres across seven countries in continental Europe from ArcelorMittal.

In October 2019, Gupta consolidated all his global steel businesses to form Liberty Steel Group, which he announced would aim to be the world's first carbon neutral company by 2030. He extended that target to his aluminium businesses, which he grouped together to form ALVANCE Aluminium Group, which he announced in January 2020.

He has been dubbed the man who can save the British steel industry through an approach called Greensteel, and has since been working to apply this model of operation to other countries including Australia and the USA.

Awards and recognition
The HRH Prince of Wales appointed Gupta as an official HRH Ambassador for Industrial Cadets in March 2018.

Controversies

Ties to Greensill Capital 

Following the 2021 collapse of Greensill Capital, Sanjeev Gupta has been under scrutiny for his ties to the failed company. The Financial Times noted in 2019 that Gupta's companies have been fueled by "opaque financing". In April 2021, a Member of Parliament in the UK accused Gupta of running "a potential Ponzi scheme". Greensill Capital's bankruptcy administrator was unable to verify invoices underpinning certain loans to Gupta, with companies listed on the invoices denying that they had ever done business with Gupta.

Personal life
Gupta's wife Nicola Crumpton is from Canvey Island, Essex, and was the treasurer of his company. Gupta had kept his relationship with Crumpton secret for seven years before they married in 2008, the family's first cross-cultural marriage. Gupta and Crumpton own Wyelands, a country house estate near Chepstow in Wales and have a residence in Sydney, Australia (Bomera, a 19th-century home in Potts Point). They have three children.

See also
 Tata Steel Europe

References

External links
 

Living people
Businesspeople from Ludhiana
People educated at St Edmund's School Canterbury
Alumni of Trinity College, Cambridge
1971 births